Samuel Lawrence Watson (born September 19, 1978) is an American politician from Georgia. Watson was a Republican member of the Georgia House of Representatives from 2013 to 2022.

References

Republican Party members of the Georgia House of Representatives
21st-century American politicians
Living people
1978 births